Ryan Semple (born 2 July 1977) is a football midfielder from Northern Ireland, currently playing with Dergview. He is a former Peterborough United, Derry City, Linfield, Institute and Limavady United player. He played for Institute for over 12 years in 3 separate stints.

References

1977 births
Living people
Association footballers from Northern Ireland
Peterborough United F.C. players
Linfield F.C. players
Derry City F.C. players
League of Ireland players
Limavady United F.C. players
Institute F.C. players
Northern Ireland under-21 international footballers
NIFL Premiership players
Association football midfielders